Fuzzy Logic Recordings is a Canadian independent record label, founded in 2002 and based out of Toronto, Ontario.

Artists 
The Bicycles
The Elwins
More Or Les

Discography 
FLR001 The Midways - Pay More And Get A Good Seat
FLR002 The Bicycles - The Good, the Bad and the Cuddly
FLR003 Woodhands/Peter Project - Split 7"
FLR004 The Bicycles - The Good, The Bad and the Cuddly: The Interactive DVD Board Game
FLR005 Prairie Cat - Attacks!
FLR006 Peter Project - Peter Project
FLR007 The Bicycles - Oh No, It's Love
FLR008 Prairie Cat - It Began/Ended with Sparks
FLR009 Gravity Wave - Gambol
FLR010 Peter Project - Fresh
FLR011 The Elwins - The Elwins (Ep) - re-release 
FLR012 Steven McKay - Steven McKay (2010)
FLR013 Doctor Ew - Gadzooks! (2010)
FLR014 More Or Les - Brunch With A Vengeance (2010)
FLR015 More Or Les - Mastication (2012)
FLR016 The Bicycles - Stop Thinking So Much (2012)
FLR017 The Bicycles - Young Drones (2014)
FLR018 Fake Palms - Fake Palms (2015) co-release
FLR019 Prairie Cat - Is Cary Pratt (2017)

See also
 List of record labels

External links
 Official site

Canadian independent record labels
Record labels established in 2002
Alternative rock record labels
Indie rock record labels
Companies based in Toronto
2002 establishments in Ontario